020120 is a live album from The Mad Capsule Markets. It was recorded live on January 20, 2002 at Zepp Tokyo. The music is basically material from the Osc-Dis and the 010 albums, but it did include a faster version of  Kami-Uta as an encore track and for the intro tape, the show opens with Crass' song Gotcha (who inspired the band in their earlier days). The UK version issued the live DVD alongside the CD with a slightly altered track listing from the Japanese version (there was no Kami Uta and Interview on the DVD) but it made the fanbase of The Mad Capsule Markets much stronger.

Track listing
"Introduction 010"
"Come"
"Chaos Step"
"Gaga Life"
"Jam!"
"Out/Definition"
"Good Girl"
"All The Time In Sunny Beach"
"Midi Surf"
"Kumo"
"Bit Crusherrrr"
"No food, Drink, or Smoking"
"This is the Mad Style"
"Good Day"
"Fly High"
"R.D.M.C"
"Tribe"
"Pulse"
"神Kami-Uta歌"
"Island"

Albums recorded at Zepp Tokyo
The Mad Capsule Markets live albums
2002 live albums
Victor Entertainment live albums